Swedish–Venezuelan relations are the bilateral relations between Sweden and Venezuela.

History 
Sweden was among the 28 European Union countries that did not recognize the results of the 2017 Venezuelan Constituent Assembly elections. Sweden also disavowed the results of the 2018 Venezuelan presidential election, where Nicolás Maduro was declared as the winner.

In 2019, during the Venezuelan presidential crisis, Sweden recognized Juan Guaidó as president of Venezuela and pledged to assist with the delivery of humanitarian aid that year. On January 31, the European Union's High Representative for Foreign Affairs, Federica Mogherini, announced the creation of a "contact group for Venezuela" initially composed of eight European and four Latin American countries, including Sweden, which would hold its first meeting in Uruguay on February 7 and work for 90 days on the possibility of facilitating a dialogue leading to elections in Venezuela.

Diplomatic missions 
Sweden is represented in Venezuela through its embassy in Bogotá, Colombia. Consulates-generales in Caracas and consulate in Porlamar, Isla Margarita. Venezuela had an embassy in Stockholm until March 2018. The Venezuelan embassy in Sweden had been founded as a consulate in 1948, and became an embassy in 1961.

See also 

 Foreign relations of Sweden
 Foreign relations of Venezuela
 Negotiations during the Venezuelan crisis

References 

Sweden–Venezuela relations
Venezuela
Sweden